Sam Burns  (born 1996) is an American golfer.

Sam Burns may also refer to:

Sam Burns (footballer) (born 2002), English footballer

See also
Samuel Burns (born 1982), American rower
Sam Berns (1996–2014), American activist